Ali Tawfik Youssif (born 15 April 1924) was an Egyptian rower. He competed in the men's coxed pair event at the 1952 Summer Olympics.

References

External links
 
 

1924 births
Possibly living people
Egyptian male rowers
Olympic rowers of Egypt
Rowers at the 1952 Summer Olympics
Place of birth missing